The 2013 Vanderbilt Commodores football team represented Vanderbilt University during the 2013 NCAA Division I FBS football season.  The Commodores played their seven home games at Vanderbilt Stadium at Dudley Field in Nashville, Tennessee, which has been Vanderbilt football's home stadium since 1922. The 2013 team was coming off back-to-back bowls for the first time in school history. The 2012 season was the best win percentage since 1955 (.692); the nine wins were the most since 1915, and the 5 SEC wins were the most since 1935. The 2013 team was headed by James Franklin who was in his 3rd and final year at Vanderbilt. It marked the Commodores 123rd overall season, 80th as a member of the Southeastern Conference (SEC) and its 22nd within the SEC Eastern Division. For the third straight year Vanderbilt had made it to a bowl game. Vandy defeated the Houston Cougars in the BBVA Compass Bowl 41–24. Vanderbilt finished with 9 wins in back to back seasons for the first time in school history.

Before the season
A small amount of controversy occurred when Vanderbilt canceled games at home with Northwestern and away with Ohio State. Letters were sent cancelling the games, with the explicit reason being the need to accommodate Mizzou into Vanderbilt's SEC East Division. Northwestern, like Vanderbilt in the SEC, is the sole private institution in the Big 10, alleged that the real reason was fear on the part of Vanderbilt to continue playing its Big 10 counterpart—a series which had been referred to as the Battle of the Nerds.

Rape case
On August 9, 2013, four Vanderbilt football players were arrested and indicted for rape. Brandon Vandenburg, Cory Lamont Batey, Brandon E. Banks, and Jaborian "Tip" McKenzie were taken into custody and given a state-mandated HIV test in connection with the Vanderbilt rape case. All four men were charged with five counts of aggravated rape and two counts of aggravated sexual battery. They allegedly carried an unconscious  21-year-old female student into a dorm room in the school's Gilette House, and gang-raped and sodomized her on the floor in a 32-minute attack on June 23, 2013. They took graphic photos and videos of the rape. The victim (who is White) told the court that after Batey (who is Black) raped her, he urinated on her face while saying she deserved what he was doing to her because of the color of her skin, which sources reported was "That’s for 400 years of slavery you b----." The defendants were dismissed from the football team on June 29, 2013 and banned from campus during the six-week investigation that followed. A fifth player, Chris Boyd, pleaded guilty to criminal attempt to commit accessory after the fact and was dismissed from the team but not the university for his role in helping to cover up the rape. Three of the players were convicted, and received prison sentences ranging from 15 years, the minimum allowed by Tennessee law for their crimes, to 17 years. The fourth player accepted a plea deal which included 10 years' probation, and did not receive any jail time.

Coaching staff

Recruiting

Schedule

Rankings

References

Vanderbilt
Vanderbilt Commodores football seasons
Birmingham Bowl champion seasons
Vanderbilt Commodores football